Pokr Masrik is a village in the Vardenis Municipality of the Gegharkunik Province of Armenia. Azerbaijanis lived in the village prior to their exodus from Armenia after the outbreak of the Nagorno-Karabakh conflict. From 1988 and onward, Armenian refugees from Azerbaijan settled in the village. The village is located close to Mets Masrik.

History 
The village has a 12th-century church.

Demographics 
The population of the town consisted of 227 Muslims in 1831 rising to 1,200 in 1897 and to 1,375 by 1916.

Gallery

References

External links 

Populated places in Gegharkunik Province